The Men's High Jump F44/46 had its Final held on September 14 at 18:50.

Medalists

Results

References
Final

Athletics at the 2008 Summer Paralympics
2008 Paralympics